Grewia mollis is a widespread species of flowering plant in the family Malvaceae, native to tropical Africa, Yemen and Oman. It is the source of grewia gum, an edible polysaccharide mucilage, similar in its properties to tragacanth gum.

References

mollis
Flora of West Tropical Africa
Flora of West-Central Tropical Africa
Flora of Northeast Tropical Africa
Flora of East Tropical Africa
Flora of Angola
Flora of Zambia
Flora of Yemen
Flora of Oman
Plants described in 1804